Dover MRT station is an elevated Mass Rapid Transit (MRT) station on the East West line in Queenstown planning area, Singapore, located along Commonwealth Avenue West.

It was the first infill station added to an existing line on the Singapore MRT network. It is also the first elevated station in Singapore with two side platforms on either side of the tracks, as opposed to having an island platform commonly found in other elevated MRT stations. A similar layout was adopted at Canberra MRT station.

As the second above-ground MRT station built in the late 1990s and the early 2000s, it has a distinctive architectural design. Like most projects of this period, the use of glass and steel is extensive.

Dover station provides MRT access to students and staff of Singapore Polytechnic, as well as residents of the nearby Mount Sinai and Dover estates.

History

Dover MRT station was announced on 28 July 1997. Adjacent to the Singapore Polytechnic on one side, and undeveloped land on the other, the building of the station was met with reservations by some members of the public over the small area it serviced when construction began in June 1998. There were criticisms over the spending of "taxpayers' money" chiefly for use only by students of one educational institution. The Land Transport Authority, the government department in charge of public transport operations, proceeded with the construction anyway, to serve commuters along Singapore Polytechnic with Dover housing estate. Originally, the station was named Polytechnic in the planning stage. With the change of plans, it was renamed to Dover, after the nearby Dover Road. Half height platform screen doors (HHPSD) were installed in this station and they became operational on 5 August 2011. During the construction, trains on the East-West Line ran slower.

Station Details 
Originally, the station was not assigned a station code. On 18 July 2001, with the introduction of the new MRT map, including new station codes, Dover was assigned with EW22. Test runs occurred from 13 to 17 October 2001 when the trains stopped at this station but did not open their doors.

Shuttle buses were provided from this station to National University Hospital (NUH), previously from Buona Vista. However, services ceased with effect from 1 November 2011 due to the opening of Kent Ridge MRT station on the Circle line, which is located within NUH premises.

References

External links
 
 Dover to Changi Airport MRT station route guide

Railway stations in Singapore opened in 2001
Queenstown, Singapore
Dover, Singapore
Mass Rapid Transit (Singapore) stations